The 1928 British Columbia general election was the seventeenth general election in the Province of British Columbia, Canada. It was held to elect members of the Legislative Assembly of British Columbia. The election was called on June 7, 1928, and held on July 18, 1928.  The new legislature met for the first time on January 22, 1929.

The Conservative Party defeated the governing Liberal Party, taking over half the popular vote, and 35 of the 48 seats in the legislature.  The Liberals' popular vote also increased significantly, but because of the disappearance of the Provincial Party and the Canadian Labour Party, which had won over 35% of the vote together in the previous election, the Liberals were defeated.  Notably, as of 2019, this remains the final election in British Columbia history where the Conservative Party would achieve power in its own right.

Results

Note:

* Party did not nominate candidates in the previous election.

Results by riding

|-
||    
|align="center"  |William Robert Rutledge
|align="center"  |BurnabyConservative
||    
||    
|align="center"  |AlberniLiberal
|align="center"  |Laurence Arnold Hanna
||    
|-
||    
|align="center"  |Roderick MacKenzie
|align="center"  |CaribooConservative
||    
||    
|align="center"  |AtlinLiberal
|align="center"  |Herbert Frederick Kergin
||    
|-
||    
|align="center"  |William Atkinson
|align="center"  |ChilliwackConservative
||    
||    
|align="center"  |ColumbiaLiberal
|align="center"  |John Andrew Buckham
||    
|-
||    
|align="center"  |George Kerr McNaughton
|align="center"  |ComoxConservative
||    
||    
|align="center"  |CranbrookLiberal
|align="center"  |Frank Mitchell MacPherson
||    
|-
||    
|align="center"  |Cyril Francis Davie
|align="center"  |Cowichan-NewcastleConservative
||    
||    
|align="center"  |NanaimoLiberal
|align="center"  |George Sharratt Pearson
||    
|-
||    
|align="center"  |Fred W. Lister
|align="center"  |CrestonConservative
||    
||    
|align="center"  |New WestminsterLiberal
|align="center"  |Arthur Wellesley Gray
||    
|-
||    
|align="center"  |John Walter Berry
|align="center"  |DeltaConservative
||    
||    
|align="center"  |North VancouverLiberal
|align="center"  |Ian Alistair MacKenzie
||    
|-
||    
|align="center"  |Nelson Seymour Lougheed
|align="center"  |DewdneyConservative
||    
||    
|align="center"  |OminecaLiberal
|align="center"  |Alexander Malcolm Manson
||    
|-
||    
|align="center"  |Robert Henry Pooley
|align="center"  |EsquimaltConservative
||    
||    
|align="center"  |Prince RupertLiberal
|align="center"  |Thomas Dufferin Pattullo2
||    
|-
||    
|align="center"  |Frederick Parker Burden
|align="center"  |Fort GeorgeConservative
||    
||    
|align="center"  |RevelstokeLiberal
|align="center"  |William Henry Sutherland
||    
|-
||    
|align="center"  |Charles Morgan Kingston
|align="center"  |Grand Forks-GreenwoodConservative
||    
||    
|align="center"  |SkeenaLiberal
|align="center"  |Horace Cooper Wrinch
||    
|-
||    
|align="center"  |Cyrus Wesley Peck
|align="center"  |The IslandsConservative
||    
||    
|align="center"  |YaleLiberal
|align="center"  |John Joseph Alban Gillis
||    
|-
||    
|align="center"  |John Ralph Michell
|align="center"  |KamloopsConservative
||    
||    
|align="center"  |FernieIndependent Labour Party
|align="center"  |Thomas Aubert Uphill
||    
|-
||    
|align="center"  |James Fitzsimmon
|align="center"  |Kaslo-SlocanConservative
||    
|-
||    
|align="center"  |Ernest Crawford Carson
|align="center"  |LillooetConservative
||    
|-
||    
|align="center"  |Michael Manson
|align="center"  |MackenzieConservative
||    
|-
||    
|align="center"  |Lorris E. Borden
|align="center"  |NelsonConservative
||    
|-
||    
|align="center"  |William Farris Kennedy
|align="center"  |North OkanaganConservative
||    
|-
||    
|align="center"  |Samuel Lyness Howe
|align="center"  |Richmond-Point GreyConservative
||    
|-
||    
|align="center"  |James Hargrave Schofield
|align="center"  |Rossland-TrailConservative
||    
|-
||    
|align="center"  |Simon Fraser Tolmie 1
|align="center"  |SaanichConservative
||    
|-
||    
|align="center"  |Rolf Wallgren Bruhn 
|align="center"  |Salmon ArmConservative
||    
|-
||    
|align="center"  |William Alexander McKenzie 
|align="center"  |SimilkameenConservative
||    
|-
||    
|align="center"  |James William Jones 
|align="center"  |South OkanaganConservative
||    
|-
||    
|align="center"  |Jonathan Webster Cornett 
|align="center"  |South VancouverConservative
||    
|-
||    
|align="center"  |William Dick 
|align="center" rowspan=6 |Vancouver CityConservative
||    
|-
||    
|align="center"  |Thomas Henry Kirk 
||    
|-
||    
|align="center"  |Royal Maitland 
||    
|-
||    
|align="center"  |William Curtis Shelly 
||    
|-
||    
|align="center"  |Nelson Spencer 
||    
|-
||    
|align="center"  |George Alexander Walkem 
||    
|-
||    
|align="center"  |James Harry Beatty 
|align="center" rowspan=4 |Victoria CityConservative
||    
|-
||    
|align="center"  |Reginald Hayward 
||    
|-
||    
|align="center"  |Joshua Hinchcliffe 
||    
|-
||    
|align="center"  |Harold Despard Twigg 
||    
|-
|-
|-
|-
|
|align="center"|1  Premier-Elect
|-
|
|align="center"|2  Leader of the Opposition
|-
| align="center" colspan="10"|Source: Elections BC
|-
|}

Notes

See also
List of British Columbia political parties

Further reading
 

1928
1928 elections in Canada
1928 in British Columbia
July 1928 events